The British Music Hall Society is a registered charity in the United Kingdom. Its remits are to advance the education of the public in the traditions of the British Music Hall and the art of the present-day performer; and to preserve memorabilia in the form of records, films, electronic media, photographs, literature, costumes and personal properties appertaining to music halls and music hall performers.

The charity was founded by Raymond Mackender and Gerald Glover in 1963. The Society President is currently Paul O'Grady. The vice-president is Wyn Calvin, and the Society's patrons are Sir John Major, Michael Grade, Lady Anne Dodd, Sir Cliff Richard, Alan Titchmarsh, Alison Titchmarsh, Jools Holland and Gary Wilmot. Previous patrons included Des O'Connor, Sir Ken Dodd and Val Doonican.

History 
The Society was created out of the demise and demolition of The Metropolitan Theatre, Edgware Road and other music halls in the early 1960s, coupled with Mackender and Glover's awareness that this period of performing history was being forgotten. Mackender put a series of advertisements in The Stage appealing for items of music hall interest 'for safekeeping....' Out of this emerged the British Music Hall Society ("BMHS")

An Exhibition and Variety Show, known as the "Festival of Music Hall" was organised by the Society and the then Variety Artistes' Federation on 2 November 1963 to celebrate the centenary of McDonald's Music Hall (now Hoxton Hall).

In December 1963, the first edition of the Society's Journal, The Call Boy, was published. The Journal continues as a quarterly publication, free to Society members.

The first of what was to become a regular monthly meeting of the Society took place on 7 January 1964 at the Garrick Hotel, Charing Cross Road, London with Ada Reeve as the guest of honour.

In 2013, the Society celebrated their 50th Anniversary with a Festival of Music Hall (and Variety) at Wilton's Music Hall, Whitechapel, London. Since 2014, the Society has held an annual one-day event, Day by the Sea at the Royal Hippodrome Theatre, Eastbourne featuring comedy, music, discussion and film footage.

The Society holds an extensive archive with photographs, posters, sheet music, playbills, programmes and the personal items of many artistes including Marie Lloyd, Little Tich, Max Miller, Florrie Forde, Ida Barr, Hetty King and Harry Tate. They also hold a sound archive. The Society is a member of the Association of Performing Arts Collections (APAC).

Presidents - past and present
1963-1979 - Don Ross
1980-1983 - Lew Lane
1984-1985 - Ellis Ashton MBE
1986-1992 - Louis Benjamin
1992-2020 - Roy Hudd OBE
2020–present - Paul O'Grady MBE

References

External links
 Official website 
  British Music Hall Society page at the UK Charity Commission website

British culture